Jos Orno Imsula Airport  is an airport serving the town of Tiakur, on the Moa island in the Southwest Maluku Regency of the Maluku province, Indonesia.

Airlines and destinations
The following destinations are served from Jos Orno Imsula Airport:

References

Airports in Maluku